The feudal barony of Bampton was one of eight feudal baronies in Devonshire which existed during the mediaeval era, and had its caput at Bampton Castle within the manor of Bampton.

Descent

Domesday Book
The Domesday Book of 1086 lists Baentone as one of the 27 Devon holdings of Walter of Douai, also known therein as Walscin. Walter was also feudal baron of Castle Cary  in Somerset. At Bampton he established a castle, the motte of which survives today. The manor was a very large holding of 76 households, and previously to the Norman Conquest of England of 1066 had been held in demesne by King Edward the Confessor. As  a  manor in the royal demesne it had paid no tax. Walter had obtained it from William the Conqueror in exchange for the manors previously granted to him of Ermington and Blackawton.  According to the Book of Fees the member manors of the barony of Bampton included: Duvale, Hele (possibly Hele, Clayhanger), Doddiscombe, Hockworthy, Havekareland (possibly Hawkerland, Colaton Raleigh), and Legh (Lea Barton, Hockworthy). Walter held the manor of Bampton in demesne, but nevertheless he had three tenants who held land somewhere within the manor, namely two men named Rademar, one of whom  appears to have been a tenant of several of Walter's Somerset manors. One may possibly have been Rademar the Clerk, Walter's brother. The third tenant was Gerard, thought to have been Walter's steward and his tenant at Bratton Seymour in Somerset. The descent from Walter of Douai was as follows:
 Robert of Douai (son), who in 1136 rebelled against King Stephen, when his lands passed to his daughter and heiress Juliana.
 Juliana of Douai, who married as her first husband Fulk Paynel (died c. 1165)

Paynel
The Duchess of Cleveland in her Battle Abbey Roll stated of the Paynel (alias Painell, Paganel, Pagnell, etc.) family: "The various accounts of it, either by Dugdale, or the county historians of places where they held lands, are so contradictory to each other, that to endeavour to reconcile them to any degree of correctness would require more consumption of time and expense in the investigation of public records, than would compensate any author for the undertaking."—Banks. I, for one, should be far from coveting such a task, even if I possessed the ability that it would require". The descent of Paynel, feudal barons of Bampton is as follows, according to Sanders (1960):
 Fulk Paynel (died c. 1165), husband of Juliana of Douai
 Fulk Paynel (died 1208), who in 1180 offered 1,000 marks in payment of feudal relief on his inheritance, but fled England in 1185, when the barony escheated to the crown until restored to Fulk in 1199, on payment of 1,000 marks.
 William Paynel (died 1228), son and heir, paid 200 marks feudal relief for his inheritance. He married Alice Brewer, 4th daughter and co-heiress of William Brewer (died 1226), Sheriff of Devon, and widow of Reginald de Mohun (died 1213) feudal baron of Dunster, Somerset.
 William Paynel (died 1248), who left as his heir his sister Auda Paynell (died 1261), wife of John de Ballon (died 1275), feudal baron of Much Marcle in Herefordshire.

Ballon
The first members of this family to have come to England were Wynebald de Ballon (c. 1058 – c. 1126), and his brother Hamelin de Ballon (c. 1060 – c. 1090 or 1105/6), sons of Drogo (or Dru) de Ballon, lord of the castle of Ballon,  12 miles north of Le Mans, capital of the ancient province of Maine. From its strength the castle was known as "The Gateway to Maine". Ballon is today a French commune, in the department of Sarthe (72), in the modern region of Pays de la Loire. Maine was  invaded and conquered by William Duke of Normandy in the early 1060s, just prior to his invasion of England.
 John de Ballon (died 1275), feudal baron of Much Marcle in Herefordshire.  He was charged £100 in feudal relief for the lands of his brother-in-law William Paynel. He died without children from Auda Paynel from whose death in 1261 until 1267 the barony passed to the wardship of Edmund of Lancaster (1245–1296), the second surviving son of King Henry III .

Cogan
 
 John de Cogan (died 1302), to whom Edmund of Lancaster surrendered the barony in 1267, was the son of William Cogan, who was a grandson of Fulk Paynel (died 1208), being the son of Fulk's daughter Christiana by her husband Miles de Cogan (died 1182). Miles de Cogan was according to the antiquary Sir William Pole (died 1635) the great soldier and undertaker of the Irish Conquest.  John de Cogan was recorded as holding his lands at Bampton by the feudal tenure per baroniam ("by barony")  by the service of 1 knight's fee and performed the service in 1277 Risdon stated that at Bampton the Cogans "had...a very stately house and kept great entertainment when they lived here, and having greater possessions in Ireland for the most part dwelt there".
 Thomas de Cogan (died 1315), son and heir
 Richard de Cogan (1299–1368) On 17 March 1336 Richard Cogan obtained a royal licence to crenellate  his mansion-house at Baumton, and to enclose his wood of Uffculme and 300 acres of land for a deer-park. The house is believed by Lysons (1822) to have been near the castle keep,    but  no remains of the buildings survive. It was the residence of the Cogans and their successors, down to the time of the Bourchiers. He married Mary Montagu, a daughter of William Montagu, 2nd Baron Montagu (c. 1285 – 1319) 
 John Cogan (died 1382), who died as a minor in the wardship of the king, was the son of Sir William Cogan (died 1382) by his second wife Isabel Loring, the elder daughter and co-heiress of Sir Nele Loring (c. 1320 – 1386), KG, of Knowstone and Landkey in Devon and of Chalgrave, Bedfordshire, a founding member of the Order of the Garter. John's heiress was his sister Elizabeth Cogan, the wife of Fulk FitzWarin, 5th Baron FitzWarin (1362–1391), who from his mother Margaret Audley, 3rd daughter and co-heiress of James Audley, 2nd Baron Audley (died 1386), feudal baron of Barnstaple, was the heir to the manor of Tawstock which had become the later seat of the feudal barons of Barnstaple, and where the Bourchiers later made their principal seat.

FitzWarin

The FitzWarin family were powerful Marcher Lords seated at Whittington Castle in Shropshire and at Alveston in Gloucestershire. The title Baron FitzWarin was created by writ of summons for Fulk FitzWarine in 1295. The descent of the barony of Bampton in the FitzWarin family is as follows:
 Fulk FitzWarin, 5th Baron FitzWarin (1362–1391), husband of Elizabeth Cogan, heiress of Bampton.
 Fulk FitzWarin, 6th Baron FitzWarin (1389–1407), son.
 Fulk FitzWarin, 7th Baron FitzWarin (1406–1420), son, died aged 14 when his heir became his sister Elizabeth FitzWarin.
 Elizabeth FitzWarin, 8th Baroness FitzWarin (c. 1404 – c. 1427), sister, married Richard Hankford, son and heir of Richard Hankford (dvp 1419), son of Sir William Hankford (c. 1350 – 1423), of Annery, Devon,  Chief Justice of the King's Bench.  Upon her death the barony must have been in abeyance between her daughters Thomasine Hankford (1423–1453) and Elizabeth Hankford (c. 1424 – 1433) until the death of the latter in 1433.

Hankford

Sir Richard Hankford (c. 1397 – 1431) (grandson and heir of Sir William Hankford (died 1422) of  Annery, Devon,  Lord Chief Justice of England)  married as his first wife Elizabeth FitzWarin, 8th Baroness FitzWarin (c. 1404 – c. 1427). Upon her death the barony must have been in abeyance between her daughters Thomasine Hankford (1423–1453), born and baptised at Tawstock, and Elizabeth Hankford (c. 1424 – 1433) until the death of the latter in 1433, when Thomasine became 9th Baroness.

Bourchier

The Bourchier family, the Devon branch of which, seated at Tawstock Court, was later created Earls of Bath, retained the manor of Bampton until at least the time of Risdon (died 1640)  who states in his Survey of Devon that "the Earl of Bath is lord of this manor". The descent of Bampton was as follows:
 William Bourchier, 9th Baron FitzWarin (1407–1470), husband of Thomasine Hankeford, 9th Baroness FitzWarin  (1423–1453). He was the 2nd son of William Bourchier, 1st Count of Eu (1386–1420) by his wife   Anne of Gloucester  (1383–1438), eldest daughter of  Thomas of Woodstock, 1st Duke of Gloucester (1355–1397) (by his wife Eleanor de Bohun),  youngest child of King Edward III.  He was summoned to Parliament as Lord FitzWarin in right of his wife and is thus deemed to have become 9th Baron FitzWarin. William Bourchier had three distinguished brothers: Henry Bourchier, 1st Earl of Essex (1404 – 4 April 1483), eldest brother;  John Bourchier, 1st Baron Berners (1415–1474), younger brother;  and Thomas Bourchier, (c. 1404 – 1486), Archbishop of Canterbury and a cardinal, youngest brother. His sister Eleanor Bourchier, (c. 1417 – 1474) married  John de Mowbray, 3rd Duke of Norfolk. Thomasine was buried in Bampton Church, and the surviving fragments of a tomb chest there re-set into the north wall of the chancel and displaying in a row within quatrefoils Bourchier Knots alternating with water bougets of the Bourchier arms is said by Pevsner to be that of Thomasine Hankford (died 1453), wife of William Bourchier (1407–1470) William Bourchier died before 12 December 1469 and was buried in the Church of the Austin Friars in London. His will was dated at Bampton 13 February 1466/7. 
 Fulk Bourchier, Baron FitzWarin (died 1480). (son) He requested in his will to be buried at Bampton near the graves of his parents. He married Elizabeth Dinham, one of the four sisters and co-heiresses of John Dynham, 1st Baron Dynham  (1433–1501), KG, of Nutwell, Devon. Elizabeth remarried to Sir John Sapcotes, and a stained glass heraldic escutcheon survives in Bampton church showing the arms of Sapcotes impaling Dinham.
 John Bourchier, 1st Earl of Bath (1470–1539), (son) created Earl of Bath in 1536. He married Cecilia Daubeny, daughter of Sir Giles Daubeney and heiress of her brother Henry Daubeney, Earl of Bridgewater. His magnificent tomb with effigies of himself, his wife and their eight children was situated in the Bourchier Chapel of Bampton Church until its destruction after 1770
 John Bourchier, 2nd Earl of Bath (1499–1561), (son) who married Elizabeth Hungerford, daughter of Sir Walter Hungerford, and secondly Eleanor Manners, daughter of George Manners, 11th Baron de Ros, by whom he had John Bourchier, Lord FitzWarin.
 William Bourchier, 3rd Earl of Bath (bef. 1557–1623), (grandson, son of John Bourchier, Lord FitzWarin, who predeceased his own father). By his time the family had its main seat at Tawstock, and in the church there the 3rd Earl is buried and where survives his magnificent tomb and effigy. He married Elizabeth Russell, daughter of Francis Russell, 2nd Earl of Bedford (died 1585)

Wrey

The heir of the Bourchiers was the Wrey family of Trebeigh Manor, St Ive, Cornwall. On the death of Henry Bourchier, 5th Earl of Bath (died 1654), the last in the male line, the title became extinct. The  co-heiresses to the Bourchier lands became the three daughters of his first cousin  once removed Edward Bourchier, 4th Earl of Bath (1590–1636). The 3rd daughter,  Lady Anne Bourchier (born 1631), married firstly James Cranfield, 2nd Earl of Middlesex, the issue of which marriage was soon extinct and secondly to Sir Chichester Wrey, 3rd Baronet (1628–1668), whose descendants inherited the principal Bourchier seat of Tawstock. The Devon biographer John Prince (died 1723)  stated that in his day the most part of Bampton remained the posterity of the former Earls of Bath and was the "noble seat" of Lady Wrey, dowager of Sir Bourchier Wrey, 4th Baronet (died 1696).

Tristram
An old mansion near Bampton Castle, called Castle Grove, was the residence of  the Tristram family, who according to Lysons (1822) probably purchased it from the Bourchiers. A mural monument to John Tristram (1668–1722), last of the family to occupy the estate of Duvale within the parish of Bampton, exists in the parish church. In 1822, the site of the castle was the property of Robert Lucas, Esq., heir to the Tristram family.

Arnold
In 1720, the manor of Bampton was owned by William Arnold, gentleman.

Fellows

In 1720, the manor of Bampton  was purchased from William Arnold by  William Fellowes (died 1724), Esquire, and his brother Sir John Fellowes, 1st Baronet (died 1724) Deputy Governor of the South Sea Company. The latter died childless.

William Fellowes (died 1724)
William Fellowes had trained as a lawyer at Lincoln's Inn and rose to the position of Senior Master in Chancery. He was the son of William Fellowes by his wife, whom he married in 1653, Susannah Coulson, daughter of William Coulson (died 1664) of London and Greenwich, Kent, by Ann Rhode, daughter of Thomas Rhode, Citizen and Draper of London.> Susannah Coulson was the sister and heir of Thomas Coulson (died 1713), MP for Totnes on three occasions, 1692–95, 1698–1708 and 1710–1713 and a director of the East India Company. Coulson was buried in the Fellowes family vault in the church of St Michael Royal, City of London.  William Fellowes (died 1724) married in 1695 Mary Martyn, daughter and heiress of Joseph Martyn (died 1718) of St Mary-at-Hill parish in the City of London by his wife Mary. A fine neo-classical mural monument to Joseph Martyn with Latin inscription exists in St Mary-at-Hill Church. William Fellowes was therefore many times an heir, to his brother, who died without children, indirectly to Thomas Coulson and to his father-in-law Joseph Martyn, whose will stipulated that his daughter should invest £60,000 in landholdings in Devon. 
The following deeds are held by Norfolk Record Office: 
"Deeds re £30,000 for purchase of estate for William Fellowes, his son-in-law, left by will of Joseph Martyn 1715; manors of Eggesford, Chawley, Borriston, Cheldon, Cudlip, East Warlington, Witheridge, Drayton; hundred of Witheridge; capital messuage called Eggesford, and farm and advowson, Devon, and manor of Mountsey and estates, Somerset, Lord Doneralle to William Fellowes 1718".
William Fellowes died on 19 January 1723 and was buried at Eggesford, which he made his seat at his newly rebuilt mansion.  His heir erected a very impressive neo-classical monument which survives in Eggesford Church.

Coulson Fellows (1696–1769)
William Fellowes left at least two sons, his youngest son William Fellows the younger, of Shotesham Park, Norfolk, who established that branch of the family, and the eldest, Coulson Fellowes (1696–1769), MP for Huntingdonshire 1741–1761, of Eggesford and Ramsey Abbey, Huntingdonshire. In 1725, Coulson Fellows married Urania Herbert, daughter of Francis Herbert of Oakley Park, Shropshire, and sister of Henry Herbert, 1st Earl of Powis (1703–1772). The marriage settlement dated 1725 required him to transfer to trustees in tail male the following lands: "Manors of Eggesford, Chawley also Chawleigh, Borrington also Burrington, Cheldon Cudlip East Worlington Witherigges also Witheridge and Drayford, the Hundred of Witherigges, the capital messuage called Eggesford in Eggesford parish and Chawley, other lands in parish of Eggesford, Wembworthy, Chawley, Borrington, Winkley Rings Ash Dowland Rose Ash Crediton, South Tawton, Great Torrington, Cholmley Cheldon Cudlip East Worlington Witheridges and Drayford, parts of the Manor, borough, hundred, rights and lands of Northtawton, the Manor, borough, hundred, rights and lands of Brampton (sic, Bampton), the Manor of Hollacomb Parramore in p. of Wynkley, lands in Winkley and Winkley Town, messuages in Goldsmith Street and Keylane by Key Gate, Exeter, parts of messuages in Moreton Hamstead and Chagford and the advowsons of the churches of Eggesford, Chawley, Cheldon, and East Worlington, Devon, and the Manor of Mountsey also Mounyseaux and lands in Mounseaux and Dullverton, Somerset".

Coulson Fellows had two sons and three daughters:
 William Fellowes (died 1804), the eldest, MP for Andover in 1784 and Sudbury and Sheriff of Huntingdonshire in 1779. He married in 1768 Lavinia Smyth, daughter of John Smyth of St Audries, Somerset, and had children, his eldest son being William Henry Fellowes (1769–1837) MP for Huntingdonshire, whose second son was Edward Fellowes, 1st Baron de Ramsey (1809–1887).
 Henry Arthur Fellowes (died 1792), died unmarried, who inherited Bampton.
 Mary Fellows 
 Dorothea Fellows
 Urania Fellowes, who married John Wallop, 2nd Earl of Portsmouth (died 1797). Her son Newton Wallop (1772–1854), later 4th Earl of Portsmouth, became the eventual heir to the Fellows' estates including Eggesford and Bampton, whereupon he changed his name by royal licence to "Newton Fellows".

Henry Arthur Fellows
The 1811 edition of Risdon's Survey of Devon stated the lord of the manor and hundred of Bampton in 1810 to have been "H. A. Fellows, esquire". Henry Arthur Fellows in fact died in 1792, without children and was a younger son of Coulson Fellows (1696–1769).

Wallop/Fellows

In 1822, it was the property of the Honourable Newton Fellows, (1772–1854) of Eggesford. He had been born with the name "Newton Wallop", and was the younger son of John Wallop, 2nd Earl of Portsmouth (died 1797) by his wife Urania Fellows, sister of Henry Arthur Fellows (died 1792). Newton Wallop changed his name to Fellows after having become heir to the Fellows' estates, including Eggesford and Bampton, and eventually inherited the Earldom of Portsmouth as 4th Earl of Portsmouth, after the death of his elder brother John Wallop, 3rd Earl of Portsmouth (1767–1853).

Notes

References

Sources
 Pevsner, Nikolaus & Cherry, Bridget, The Buildings of England: Devon, London, 2004
 Hoskins, W.G., A New Survey of England: Devon, London, 1959 (first published 1954) 
 Risdon, Tristram (died 1640), Survey of Devon, 1810 edition, London, 1810
 Gray, Todd & Rowe, Margery (Eds.), Travels in Georgian Devon: The Illustrated Journals of The Reverend John Swete, 1789–1800, 4 vols., Tiverton, 1999 
 Thorn, Caroline & Frank, (eds.) Domesday Book, (Morris, John, gen.ed.) Vol. 9, Devon, Parts 1 & 2, Phillimore Press, Chichester, 1985. 
 Vivian, Lt.Col. J.L., (Ed.) The Visitations of the County of Devon: Comprising the Heralds' Visitations of 1531, 1564 & 1620, Exeter, 1895. 
 Sanders, I.J. English Baronies: A Study of their Origin and Descent 1086–1327, Oxford, 1960

Bampton, Devon
Feudal baronies in Devon